The 2006–07 season was PFC CSKA Sofia's 59th consecutive season in A Group. This article shows player statistics and all matches (official and friendly) that the club have and will play during the 2006–07 season.

Club

Coaching staff

Team kits
The team kits for the 2006–07 season are produced by Uhlsport and sponsored by Vivatel.

Squad

As of 31 December 2006

Competitions

A Group

Table

Results summary

Results by round

Fixtures and results

Bulgarian Cup

Bulgarian Super Cup

UEFA Cup

UEFA Club Rankings
This is the current UEFA Club Rankings, including season 2005-06.

References

External links
CSKA Official Site
CSKA Fan Page with up-to-date information
Bulgarian A Professional Football Group Site

PFC CSKA Sofia seasons
Cska Sofia